CDP-L-myo-inositol myo-inositolphosphotransferase (CDP-inositol:inositol-1-phosphate transferase (bifunctional CTP:inositol-1-phosphate cytidylyltransferase/CDP-inositol:inositol-1-phosphate transferase (IPCT/DIPPS)), DIPPS (bifunctional CTP:inositol-1-phosphate cytidylyltransferase/CDP-inositol:inositol-1-phosphate transferase (IPCT/DIPPS))) is an enzyme with systematic name CDP-1L-myo-inositol:1L-myo-inositol 1-phosphate myo-inositolphosphotransferase. This enzyme catalyses the following chemical reaction

 CDP-1L-myo-inositol + 1L-myo-inositol 1-phosphate  CMP + bis(1L-myo-inositol) 3,1'-phosphate 1-phosphate

The enzyme is involved in biosynthesis of bis(1L-myo-inositol) 1,3-phosphate.

References

External links 
 

EC 2.7.8